Rannes is a rural town in the west of the locality of Goovigen in the Shire of Banana, Queensland, Australia.

Geography 
Rannes is in Central Queensland between Wowan and Banana on the Leichhardt Highway and the Don River.

History
Rannes was established as a pastoral sheep station property in April 1853 by Scottish brothers James, Norman and Charles Leith Hay. The brothers were the offspring of Peninsula War veteran Andrew Leith Hay and the grandsons of General Alexander Leith Hay of Leith Hall. They were the first Europeans to occupy the region and at that time Rannes was the northern-most outpost of British colonisation in Eastern Australia. The brothers named the property Rannes after a Leith Hay family manor house located near Buckie in Scotland.

On 11 May 1853, James Leith Hay sent a letter to Lieutenant John Murray, reporting that two of his shepherds had been murdered by Aborigine men and requested the services of the Native Police. On 16 May, Murray and a section of troopers arrived at Rannes Station. Two days later, Murray went in search for those responsible. In November 1853, James Leith Hay requested a section of Native Police be posted permanently at Rannes after two men were killed and one hundred sheep stolen. A sort of peace ensued and some of the local tribes were allowed onto the property. On the night of 23 September 1855, the Native Police barracks at Rannes was attacked by a large number of Aboriginal men, killing three troopers and leaving all but one wounded. Murray then led the Native Police and pursued Aborigines "who had taken forcible possession of a station and were prevented from murdering the inhabitants by the timely arrival of the troopers." Sub-Lieutenant Walker also led a patrol to search for the murderers but did not find them. 

The town of Rannes was surveyed by surveyor A.F. Wood in July 1860 and the town reserve was gazetted 2 October 1860 (page 396).

Rannes was once a major railway town at the junction of the Dawson Valley railway line and the Callide Valley railway line. Both railway lines having been abandoned, the Rannes railway station is no longer extant.

In 1880, the local government area Banana Division (later the Shire of Banana) was established with its headquarters in Banana (taking its name from the town). However, in 1930 the shire headquarters became Rannes and the shire offices were physically relocated from Banana to Rannes. Since 1946, the shire has its headquarters in Biloela.

Rannes railway station was originally named Kuyul, but was changed 29 April 1915.

Rannes State School opened on 14 March 1916. It closed on 23 February 1960 but reopened on 30 January 1962. It closed permanently on 18 March 1966.

Woolein State School opened on 27 February 1918 and closed on 17 August 1924.

Economy

Rannes is primarily a farming town which specialises in the beef and grain industry.

Education 
There are no schools in Rannes. The nearest government primary school is Goovigen State School in the town of Goovigen to the east. The nearest government secondary schools are Baralaba State School (to Year 10) in Baralaba to the west and Biloela State High School (to Year 12) in Biloela to the south-east.

References

Further reading 

  — includes Jooro State School, Lake Pleasant State School, Woolein State School, Rannes State School and Goovigen State School

External links 

 

Towns in Queensland
Shire of Banana